Staurogyne bicolor is a species of plant in the family Acanthaceae. It is endemic to Cameroon.  Its natural habitat is subtropical or tropical moist lowland forests. It is threatened by habitat loss.

References

Endemic flora of Cameroon
bicolor
Vulnerable plants
Taxonomy articles created by Polbot